Pu Zoduha (20 January 1940 – 20 June 2013) was an Indian politician. He was a nominated member of the Mizoram Legislative Assembly from 1984 to 1987.

Death
Zoduha died of complications from hypertension and diabetes on 20 June 2013 at the age of 73.

References

1940 births
Missing middle or first names
People from Mamit
Mizoram MLAs 1984–1987
Deaths from diabetes
Deaths from hypertension
2013 deaths
Indian National Congress politicians from Mizoram